The String Quartet No. 1 in E-flat major, Op. 12, was composed by Felix Mendelssohn in 1829, completed in London on September 14 (though begun in Berlin) and possibly dedicated to Betty Pistor, a neighbor and the daughter of a Berlin astronomer.

Movements 

Like all of Mendelssohn's string quartets, this work has four movements:

 Adagio non troppo – Allegro non tardante
 Canzonetta: Allegretto, in G minor
 Andante espressivo, in B-flat major
 Molto allegro e vivace, in C minor until a return to E-flat major (and the first movement's material) in the coda

A typical performance lasts just under 25 minutes.

References

External links 

String quartets by Felix Mendelssohn
1829 compositions
Compositions in E-flat major